The Jadro is a watercourse in Dalmatia, Croatia, that discharges into the Adriatic Sea.  The upper reaches of the Jadro River, as well as its source, Jadro Spring,  are protected as an ichthyological nature reserve, partly due to the presence of an endemic species of soft-mouthed trout.  The headwaters of the Jadro River were the original water supply for the ancient city comprised by Diocletian's Palace (now an area within the present day city of Split). Contemporary studies indicate favourable water quality levels of the river near the headwaters at Jadro Spring.

The Jadro flows through the town of Solin and has a length of approximately four kilometres' moreover, the river  provides water to the cities of Split, Kaštela and Trogir. People from Solin also call it Solinska rika.

Salmo obtusirostris salonitana is an endemic trout species living in this river, which is currently endangered by the rainbow trout.

References

Bibliography

 

Rivers of Croatia
Landforms of Split-Dalmatia County
Drainage basins of the Adriatic Sea